Get It Together is an Australian children's television game show which first aired on ABC ME on 8 July 2019, hosted by Kayne Tremills. Kayne and his drill sergeant (Naomi Higgins) put Australia's messiest, most disorganised and most forgetful families to the ultimate test.

References

Australian Broadcasting Corporation original programming
Australian children's television series
2019 Australian television series debuts
2010s Australian game shows